Rainton Meadows railway station served the village of West Rainton, County Durham, England from 1840 to 1844 on the Durham Junction Railway.

History 
The station opened on 9 March 1840 by the Durham Junction Railway. It was situated between Marks Lane and Meadows Lane. It was never mentioned in Bradshaw's railway guide but it was mentioned in Robinson's and Branding Junction's guides. The station closed on 19 June 1844 but a siding continued use as a dumping ground until the late twentieth century.

References

External links 

Disused railway stations in County Durham
Railway stations in Great Britain opened in 1840
Railway stations in Great Britain closed in 1844
1840 establishments in England
1844 disestablishments in England